A strange particle is an elementary particle with a strangeness quantum number different from zero. Strange particles are members of a large family of elementary particles carrying the quantum number of strangeness, including several cases where the quantum number is hidden in a strange/anti-strange pair, for example in the ϕ meson. The classification of particles, as mesons and baryons, follows the quark/anti-quark and three quark content respectively. Murray Gell-Mann recognized the group structure of elementary particle classification introducing the flavour SU(3) and strangeness as a new quantum number.

See also
 Strange matter
 Strange quark

References

Particle physics